Jusufu Mansaray is a Sierra Leonean politician. He is a member of the Sierra Leone People's Party and is one of the representatives in the Parliament of Sierra Leone for Bo District, elected in 2007.

References

Members of the Parliament of Sierra Leone
Year of birth missing (living people)
Living people
Sierra Leone People's Party politicians
Place of birth missing (living people)